Ctenucha reducta is a moth of the family Erebidae. It is found in Peru.

References

reducta
Moths described in 1912